Derek Mark Lane (born 7 October 1974) is a former English cricketer. Lane was a right-handed batsman who bowled right-arm fast-medium. He was born in Wakefield, Yorkshire.

Lane made his debut for Hertfordshire in the 1998 Minor Counties Championship against Buckinghamshire. Lane played 2 further matches for Hertfordshire in 1998, against Norfolk and Staffordshire. The following season, he made 2 List A appearances for Hertfordshire. The first came in the 1st round against the Leicestershire Cricket Board in the 1999 NatWest Trophy. He was dismissed for 2 runs in this match by Neil Pullen, while with the ball he took the wicket of Nemesh Patel for the cost of 38 runs. His second appearance came in the 2nd round against the Sussex Cricket Board. In this match, he wasn't required to bat and bowled 3 wicket-less overs.

Lane later joined Bedfordshire, making his debut for the county in the 2003 Minor Counties Championship against Hertfordshire. He played 2 further matches for Bedfordshire: one in the 2003 Minor Counties Championship against Norfolk and another in the 2004 Minor Counties Championship against Staffordshire. He also made his only MCCA Knockout Trophy appearance in 2003 against Suffolk. In 2003, he played his only List A match for Bedfordshire against Warwickshire in the 3rd round of the 2003 Cheltenham & Gloucester Trophy. In this match, he scored 10 runs before being dismissed by Mark Wagh, while with the ball he took the wicket of Jim Troughton for the cost of 37 runs from 10 overs.

He has also played County Championship Second XI cricket for the Durham, Worcestershire, Hampshire and Surrey Second XI's.

References

External links

1974 births
Living people
Cricketers from Wakefield
English cricketers
Hertfordshire cricketers
Bedfordshire cricketers
English cricketers of 1969 to 2000
English cricketers of the 21st century